"Last Night" is a song written by John Byron, Ashley Gorley, Jacob Kasher Hindlin, and Ryan Vojtesak, and recorded by American country music singer Morgan Wallen. It is the third single from his 2023 album One Thing at a Time. The song peaked at number one on Billboard Hot Country Songs in February 2023 before reaching the top of the Billboard Hot 100 in March 2023, making it Wallen's first number-one single on the latter chart.

Content
The song is about a couple having their "last night" together. Phil Arnold of Music Talkers praised the song's use of acoustic guitar and the "flow" of the lyrics.

Chart performance
The song peaked at number one on the Billboard Hot Country Songs charts dated February 13, 2023, ascending from a debut position of number seven one week prior. The same week, his prior singles "Thought You Should Know" and "You Proof" claimed the number two and three positions, while "I Wrote the Book" was at number ten.

Following the release of One Thing at a Time, "Last Night" ascended from number five to one on the Billboard Hot 100 dated March 18, 2023, becoming Wallen's first number one on the chart. The song achieved 47.5 million streams, 18,000 digital downloads sold, and a 10.8 million airplay audience. The same week, Wallen occupied 36 places on the Hot 100, the most of any artist, as well as five of the top 10 on the Hot 100. It was also the first country song by a solo male to top the Hot 100 in over 42 years, following "I Love a Rainy Night" by Eddie Rabbitt (1980), and the first country song to top the chart since "All Too Well (Taylor's Version)" by Taylor Swift in November 2021.

Charts

References

2020s ballads
2023 singles
2023 songs
Morgan Wallen songs
Billboard Hot 100 number-one singles
Song recordings produced by Joey Moi
Songs written by Ashley Gorley
Songs written by Jacob Kasher
Big Loud singles
Country ballads
Pop ballads
Songs about alcohol